Richard Klein may refer to:
 Richard Klein (astronomer), American professor
 Richard Klein (artist) (1890–1967), German artist active during the Nazi era
 Richard Klein (paleoanthropologist) (born 1941), American professor
 Richard Klein (television executive) (born 1958), controller of BBC Four
 Richard Rudolf Klein (1921–2011), German composer, musician and teacher
 Dick Klein (basketball) (1920–2000), American basketball player
 Dick Klein (American football) (1934–2005), American football player

See also
 Richard Kline (disambiguation)